Edo North Senatorial District in Edo State comprises six local government areas which consist of Etsako West, Etsako East, Etsako Central, Owan West, Owan East and Akoko Edo. The headquarters (collation centre) of Edo North is Auchi in Etsakor West LGA.  The current representative of Edo North is Francis Alimikhena of the All Progressives Congress, APC.

List of senators representing Edo North

Notable people from Edo North 

 Michael Imoudu, a former labour union leader and founder of the Nigeria state
 Chief Julius Momo Udochi the first Nigerian ambassador to the United States
 George Agbazika Innih, one-time military governor of Bendel and Kwara States
 Abdul Rahman Mamudu, former commander of the Nigerian Army Signals Corps and military administrator in Gongola State
 John Momoh, CEO of Channels Television
 Adams Oshiomhole, past president of the Nigeria Labour Congress and past governor of Edo State
 Tony Momoh, former Minister of Information and Culture
 Anthony Ikhazoboh, minister of sports and transport
 Francis Alimikhena
 Dekeri Sunday Anamero Esq., A philanthropist and Accomplished Entrepreneur

References 

Politics of Edo State
Senatorial districts in Nigeria